107.9 Power Radio (DXKM 107.9 MHz) is an FM station owned by Rizal Memorial Colleges Broadcasting Corporation and operated by Christian Media Management, a subsidiary of Laforteza Group of Companies. Its studios and transmitter are located in Makilala.

References

External links
One Radio Kidapawan FB Page

Radio stations in Cotabato
Radio stations established in 2015